Racism in North Korea is a phenomenon that is relatively poorly understood. The North Korean media and government's usage of Korean ethnic nationalism's race-based concepts such as "pure blood" has been described as racist.

A classic North Korean short story, "Wolves" (or "Jackals",승냥이, 1951), by Han Sorya, has also been described as racist. According to the documents from Hungarian records, in 1965, a Cuban diplomat visiting Pyongyang who tried to take a picture of the ruins of the bombardment during the Korean War was beaten for being a black person, which was soon followed by an apology from Kim Il-sung. In 2014, North Korean state media published a racist rant directed at US President Barack Obama.

See also 
The Cleanest Race
Propaganda in North Korea
Racism in South Korea

References 

Social issues in North Korea
Discrimination in North Korea
Racism by country
Racism in Asia
Korean nationalism